Madison House may refer to:

Canada 
Madison House (Kincardine, Ontario), a locally listed historic house

United States 

Madison House (Watsonville, California), listed on the NRHP in Santa Cruz County, California
Madison Seminary and Home, Madison, Ohio, listed on the NRHP in Lake County, Ohio
Allen-Madison House, North Kingstown, Rhode Island, NRHP-listed
Madison Ranch, Rapid City, South Dakota, listed on the NRHP in Pennington County, South Dakota
Pap Madison Cabin, Rapid City, South Dakota, listed on the NRHP in Pennington County, South Dakota
126 Madison Avenue, New York City, a residential skyscraper.

See also
Montpelier (Orange, Virginia), estate home of U.S. president James Madison
Madison Farm Historic and Archeological District, Elliston, listed on the NRHP in Montgomery County
Madison County Sheriff's House and Jail, Edwardsville, Illinois, listed on the NRHP in Madison County
Eutaw-Madison Apartment House Historic District, Baltimore, Maryland, NRHP-listed
Madison Barracks, Sackets Harbor, New York, NRHP-listed
Madison Gas and Electric Company Powerhouse, Madison, Wisconsin, listed on the NRHP in Dane County
Madison Hotel (disambiguation)